The Belize national under-20 football team represents Belize in international football at this age level and is controlled by the Football Federation of Belize.

See also

Belize national football team

References

External links
 Belize U-20, Match Schedule and Results
 Belize Football Federation website

Belize national football team